Roger Persson (born 1 June 1974) is a Swedish cyclist. He competed in the men's cross-country mountain biking event at the 1996 Summer Olympics.

References

External links
 

1974 births
Living people
Swedish male cyclists
Olympic cyclists of Sweden
Cyclists at the 1996 Summer Olympics
People from Falkenberg
Sportspeople from Halland County